Heath Shephard (born 7 September 1969) is a former Australian rules footballer who played with Collingwood and the Brisbane Bears in the Victorian/Australian Football League (VFL/AFL).

Shephard was drafted by Collingwood under the "Father-Son" rule, as his Graeme had played at the club in the early 1970s.

Although he grew up in Tasmania, he was playing at Victorian club Robinvale when Collingwood secured his services.

He had a memorable VFL debut, against the Brisbane Bears at Victoria Park in the third round of the 1989 season. His 18 disposals included five goals and five behinds. He kicked another two goals the following week but his form then dropped off and he finished the season with nine games to his name.

In 1990, Collingwood ended up breaking their premiership drought and Shephard, having played only twice that year due to a loss of form and a broken arm, returned to Tasmania.

He spent the 1991 season with the Burnie Hawks in the TFL Statewide League and returned to the AFL the following year, joining Brisbane. Perhaps influenced by Shephard's debut performance, which had come against them, the Bears used the 65th selection of the national draft to pick him up.

His stint in Brisbane was unsuccessful and he managed just four senior games. He continued playing football in Victoria and topped the goal-kicking for West Preston Lakeside on three occasions.

References

1969 births
Australian rules footballers from Tasmania
Collingwood Football Club players
Brisbane Bears players
Burnie Hawks Football Club players
West Preston Football Club players
Living people